Western Union is an American financial services and communications company.

Western Union may also refer to:

 Western Union (alliance), the alliance established by the 1948 Treaty of Brussels
 Western Union (film), a 1941 western about the company's early days
 Western Union (schooner), a 1939 historic schooner in Key West, Florida, US
 "Western Union" (song), a 1967 song by the Five Americans
 "Western Union", a song by Bladee, Ecco2K and Thaiboy Digital as Drain Gang from Trash Island
 The Western Union splice, a method of joining electrical cable